Scottish Rite Hospital may refer to:

 CHOA Scottish Rite Hospital, Atlanta, Georgia, United States
 Texas Scottish Rite Hospital for Children, Dallas, Texas, United States

See also

 Scottish Rite Cathedral (disambiguation)